Mayagüez Mall is a shopping mall located in the municipalities of Mayagüez. Its main stores include Sears, JCPenney, Shoe Carnival, Old Navy, Marshalls, Summit Trampoline Park  and Office Max. 

There is also a heliport within the mall property. The mall is made up of three concourses which connect at a central atrium.

History
Starting development in 1970 with a $6.5 million dollar permanent mortgage put in place. The mall opened in 1972 with 60 stores, parking for 2,000 cars, and two of its later three concourses open. During that time, its main tenants were Woolworth, Walgreens and Sears. 

Throughout the late 1990s up to late 1991, the mall underwent extensive renovations, including the construction of its third and largest concourse anchored by JCPenney. 

Walmart would open a 110,000 square-foot store at the mall in late 1991 as an addition to the ongoing renovations that underwent the mall during this period of time. 

González Padín department stores an original opening day tenant which co-anchored the Sears concourse, closed in October 1995 when the chain ceased operations. Its former space was occupied later on by Sears Brand Central.

The former CineVista Theatres building shuttered with the rest of the chain in November 2008 and was demolished by 2010. Later on being replaced by a Romano's Macaroni Grill.

In December 2020, it was announced that Sears would be closing as part of a plan to close 23 stores nationwide. Both the main Sears store and Sears Brand Central closed in February 2021.

Gallery

References

External links
Map of Mayagüez Mall

Shopping malls in Puerto Rico
Shopping malls established in 1972
Buildings and structures in Mayagüez, Puerto Rico
Tourist attractions in Mayagüez, Puerto Rico